Henry Ashurst (1669–1705) was the Town Clerk of London from 1700 to 1705. He served as Member of Parliament for Preston from 1698 to 1702.

References

Town Clerks of London
1669 births
1705 deaths